Jonalaukis is a village in Jonava district municipality, in Kaunas County, in central Lithuania. According to the 2011 census, the village had a population of 6 people. The village is also home to many industrious companies, the biggest being Achema.

Demography

References

Villages in Jonava District Municipality